Juan José Soto Pacheco (born October 25, 1998) is a Dominican professional baseball outfielder for the San Diego Padres of Major League Baseball (MLB). He has previously played in MLB for the Washington Nationals.

Soto signed with the Nationals as an international free agent in 2015. He made his MLB debut in 2018 and was the runner-up for the NL Rookie of the Year Award. In 2019, he was a key part of the Nationals' first World Series championship. In 2020, he won the National League batting title with a .351 average. He won the Silver Slugger Award in 2020 and 2021 and was an All-Star in 2021 and 2022.

Early life
Soto was born in Santo Domingo, Dominican Republic, to Juan Soto, Sr. and Belkis Pacheco. He has an older sister and younger brother. His younger brother, Elian, is a third baseman and outfielder who has a verbal agreement to sign with the Nationals organization as an international free agent once he is eligible in January 2023. His father, a salesman, was a catcher in a local men's league and encouraged his son to make baseball his passion.

Professional career

Minor leagues
Soto signed with the Washington Nationals as an international free agent in July 2015. He made his professional debut in 2016 with the Gulf Coast League Nationals in the rookie-level Gulf Coast League (GCL) and was named the GCL's most valuable player after hitting .368 with five home runs and 32 runs batted in (RBIs). In September 2016 he was promoted to the Auburn Doubledays of the Class A-Short Season New York-Penn League for the final few games of the 2016 season. Appearing in six games for the Doubledays, he went 9-for-21 (.429) with three doubles and an RBI. He finished the 2016 season with an overall batting average of .368, five home runs, and 32 RBIs.

Promoted to play with the Hagerstown Suns of the Class A South Atlantic League in 2017, Soto got off to a hot start before injuring his ankle while sliding into home in a game on May 2 and landing on the disabled list. At the time of his injury, he was batting .360 with three home runs in 23 games with the Suns. In July 2017, MLB Pipeline ranked Soto the Nationals' second-best prospect and the 42nd-best among all prospects. Soto did not return to the Suns in 2017, but he had two rehabilitation stints with the Gulf Coast Nationals, one of five games in July 2017 and a second one of four games in September 2017 before injuring his hamstring and finally being shut down for the season. In those nine games with the Gulf Coast League Nationals, he went 8-for-25 (.320) with a double, a triple, and four RBIs, and finished the 2017 season with a batting average of .351, three home runs, and 18 RBIs.

Soto entered 2018 as one of the minor leagues' top prospects. He started the season with the Hagerstown Suns, hitting .373 in 16 games with five home runs and 24 RBIs, before being promoted early in the season to the Potomac Nationals in the Class A-Advanced Carolina League. After 15 games with Potomac, in which he hit .371 with seven home runs and 18 RBIs, he was promoted to play with the Harrisburg Senators in the Class AA Eastern League. He had appeared in eight games for the Senators, going 10-for-31 (.323) with two doubles, two home runs, and 10 RBIs, when on May 20, 2018, the Washington Nationals called him up to the major leagues for the first time to reinforce their outfield after an injury to second baseman and outfielder Howie Kendrick.

Washington Nationals

2018 season: Historic rookie campaign 
Soto made his major-league debut on May 20, 2018, becoming the youngest player in the major leagues at 19 years, 207 days, and the first player born in 1998 to appear in a major-league game. He came on as a pinch-hitter in the 8th inning of a game against the Los Angeles Dodgers at Nationals Park in Washington, D.C., and struck out swinging against right-handed relief pitcher Erik Goeddel.

Soto made his first major-league start the next day, playing left field in a game against the San Diego Padres at Nationals Park, and on the first pitch of his first plate appearance of the game, got his first major-league hit, a  opposite-field three-run homer off of Robbie Erlin. After rounding the bases and returning to the dugout, Soto stepped back out for a curtain call from the crowd. He became the youngest player in franchise history to hit a home run and the first teenager to homer in a major-league game since Nationals outfielder Bryce Harper did it at age 19 in 2012. "He's a special player," Harper said of Soto after the game. Soto became the youngest major league player since Ken Griffey Jr. in 1989 to be intentionally walked in a game when Baltimore Orioles manager Buck Showalter elected to do so rather than give him an opportunity to drive in a run on May 29.

In June 2018, shortly after being called up to the major leagues, Baseball America listed Soto as the Nationals' top prospect, overtaking fellow outfielder Víctor Robles, and the fourth-best overall prospect in baseball.
Soto contributed to a notable oddity when he hit a home run against the New York Yankees on June 18, 2018. The contest began on May 15, 2018, but was suspended until June 18 due to inclement weather with the score at 3–3. Since the stoppage occurred in the fifth inning, a team would have been awarded the win if they were ahead, which implied that he had technically hit a home run before his MLB debut. To prevent confusion, it was added in sequence to his already accrued home run total as his sixth home run. He had hit three home runs in his first five plate appearances against the Yankees.

On June 21, he started as the cleanup hitter for the first time in the major leagues, against the Baltimore Orioles. He doubled home the winning run in a 4–2 victory. Soto's first multi-home run game came on June 13, 2018, against the New York Yankees, and he repeated the feat on June 29, 2018, at Citizens Bank Park against the Philadelphia Phillies, tallying two home runs, four hits, and five RBIs as the Nationals defeated the Phillies 17–7. Soto had another multi-home run game against the Phillies on September 11, 2018, going 3-for-4 with four RBIs in the second game of a doubleheader. On September 16, Soto became the youngest player to steal 3 bases in a game, breaking Rickey Henderson's mark of 20 years, 241 days by accomplishing the feat at 19 years, 326 days.

In 2018, Soto slashed .292/.406/.517 with 79 walks (10th in the NL), 22 home runs, and 70 RBIs in 414 at-bats, and was the youngest player in the NL. He was named NL Rookie of the Month in June, July, and September, becoming the 6th player to win the award 3 or more times. Soto set many MLB teenage records during the season, including the most walks by a teenager (79), most multi-homer games by a teenager (3), highest OBP by a teenager (.406), and highest OPS by a teenager (.923). His 22 homers tied him with then-teammate Bryce Harper for 2nd most home runs by a teenager and he became the only teenager to walk more than 60 times in a season and post an on-base percentage over .400. He finished second in voting for NL Rookie of the Year to Braves outfielder Ronald Acuña Jr., becoming the only 3-time Rookie of the Month winner to not win the Rookie of the Year award.

After the season, Soto was selected to the MLB All-Stars Team for the 2018 MLB Japan All-Star Series.

2019 season: World Series champion 

On August 19, 2019, Soto became only the fourth player in MLB history to record 100 extra-base hits before his 21st birthday, joining Mel Ott, Tony Conigliaro, and his former teammate, Bryce Harper. He later became the seventh MLB player in history to reach 30 home runs before their 21st birthday. In 2019, he batted .282/.401/.548 with 110 runs (7th), 108 walks (3rd), 34 home runs, and 110 RBIs (9th) and he stole 12 bases in 13 attempts.

With the Nationals trailing the Milwaukee Brewers 3–1 in the bottom of the eighth during the NL Wild Card Game, Soto hit a bases-clearing single off of Brewers closer Josh Hader to give the Nationals a 4–3 lead. They would later hang on to the lead and advance to the National League Division Series.

In Game 3 of the NLDS, Soto hit his first career postseason home run off Hyun-jin Ryu. In in the decisive Game 5 of the NLDS, Soto hit an RBI single in the 6th inning off of Walker Buehler and later hit a game-tying home run in the top of the 8th off Clayton Kershaw. The Nationals would go on to win in 10 innings and eliminated the Dodgers, advancing to the National League Championship Series for the first time in franchise history. Soto went 3-16 (.188) with a double and an RBI in the NLCS against the St. Louis Cardinals and the Nationals advanced to the World Series after sweeping the best-of-seven series.

In Game 1 of the World Series, Soto hit a home run off of Astros' ace Gerrit Cole to start the fourth inning and became the fourth youngest player in MLB history to ever hit a home run in a World Series. Game 3 of the World Series fell on October 25, Soto's 21st birthday, fulfilling an approximately 10 year old prediction made by Soto's father who had said that Soto would play in the World Series on his birthday. In Game 5 of the series, Soto hit another home run off Cole, providing the lone Nationals' run in a 7–1 loss which put the Nationals down 3 games to 2 in the best-of-seven series. In Game 6, Soto hit his third home run of the series off Justin Verlander, a go-ahead solo run home run, to help force a decisive Game 7.

The Nationals would go on to win the World Series, their first in franchise history, and Soto batted .277/.373/.554 with 5 home runs and 14 RBIs in the postseason (.333/.438/.741 with 3 HR, 7 RBIs in the World Series). For the series, he led the Nationals in home runs, hits, walks and runs scored. Soto was later named the co-winner (with Stephen Strasburg) of the 2019 Babe Ruth Award. Soto was named to the All-MLB Second Team in the first edition of the annual award.

2020 season: Batting champion 
On July 23, 2020, just before the opening game of a shortened 2020 season, it was announced that Soto had tested positive for COVID-19.  Soto returned to action on August 4 after multiple negative tests; he told The Washington Post that he had been following team rules for social distancing before the positive test, never experienced COVID-19 symptoms, received negative results on three rapid-result tests the day he learned of the positive test result through the official MLB testing program, and believed the result that caused him to miss time was a false positive.

He was named National League Player of the Week on August 17, his first such honor.

Despite losing the first week of play to the positive COVID-19 test and missing some time in September with an elbow injury, Soto qualified for the batting title and became the youngest player in National League history to win, hitting .351 during the regular season. Soto also led all qualified hitters in MLB in on-base percentage (.490), slugging percentage (.695), and on-base plus slugging (1.185), posting the highest marks in those three categories for any major league hitter with at least 195 plate appearances in a season since Barry Bonds in the 2004 season.  Soto won his first career Silver Slugger Award and was also named to the All-MLB First Team for the first time in his career. In spite of Soto's exceptional play, the Nationals were unable to capitalize, missing the playoffs even with an expanded format.

2021 season: First All-Star season and NL MVP runner-up
In the Nationals' first game of the season on April 6, Soto hit a walk-off single off of Will Smith of the Atlanta Braves for his first career walk-off hit. On April 20, Soto was put on the 10-Day IL for a left shoulder strain and was reinstated to the active roster on May 4.  Soto was named a reserve to the National League All Star Team for the 2021 All Star Game, receiving his first All-Star selection.  Soto also participated in the Home Run Derby for the first time, where he upset top-seeded Los Angeles Angels pitcher/designated hitter Shohei Ohtani in double-overtime before losing in the semifinal to eventual repeat winner Pete Alonso of the New York Mets.In 2021, Soto batted .313/.465/.534 with 29 home runs, 95 RBIs, and 111 runs scored. He reinforced his reputation as the most disciplined hitter in baseball by swinging at an MLB-low 15.1% of pitches outside the strike zone, leading the next closest player, Dodgers infielder Max Muncy, by 4.0 percentage points. Soto joined Ted Williams as the only players in MLB history to have led the major leagues in on base percentage multiple times by age 22. His total of 145 walks was the highest in a single season since Barry Bonds set the major league record with 232 in 2004. Soto's former teammate Bryce Harper of the Philadelphia Phillies ranked second in the league with 100 walks, making Soto only the 6th player in the live ball era to have led his league in walks by a margin of 40 or more. He led the major leagues in walk percentage, at 22.2%, and intentional walks, with 23. He had the best walk/strikeout ratio in the majors, at 1.56. He swung at the lowest percentage of pitches of all major leaguers, at 35.0%.

Following the season, Soto was named to the All-MLB First Team and won the National League Silver Slugger Award for the outfield, receiving both honors for the second straight season. Soto was the runner up in National League Most Valuable Player Award (NL MVP) voting, losing out to Harper. Soto became the sixth player in MLB history to finish as runner-up in both MVP and Rookie of the Year voting.

Prior to the 2021–22 MLB lockout, the Nationals offered Soto a 13-year, $350 million contract extension which would've signed the then 23 year old Soto through his age 35 season in 2034. However, Soto declined the offer and said that he and his agent, Scott Boras, wanted to wait until he became a free agent after the 2024 season to sign a contract and that he "still think[s] of Washington as the place where [he] would like to spend the rest of [his] career."

2022 season

On March 22, 2022, Soto agreed to a $17.1M contract with the Nationals, avoiding arbitration. On April 12, Soto hit his 100th career home run off of Braves pitcher Bryce Elder. At the age of 23 years, 169 days, Soto became the youngest player to reach that milestone in Nationals history and the eighth-youngest player to reach the milestone in MLB history.

Soto reportedly rejected a 15-year, $440 million contract extension offer by the Nationals during the 2022 season.

Soto was named to the 2022 Major League Baseball All-Star Game and also participated in the 2022 Major League Baseball Home Run Derby, which he won. He became the second youngest Home Run Derby winner behind Juan González who won in 1993; Soto was one day older.

San Diego Padres

On August 2, 2022, Soto, along with Josh Bell, was traded to the San Diego Padres in exchange for C. J. Abrams, MacKenzie Gore, Robert Hassell, James Wood, Jarlín Susana, and Luke Voit. The magnitude of the trade drew comparisons to the Herschel Walker trade in the NFL. 

On August 12, 2022, just ten days after being traded to the Padres, Soto faced the Nationals in Washington, where he received a 45-second-long standing ovation from the crowd. For the remainder of the 2022 season with the Padres, Soto played 51 games with the team, compiling a .240 batting average, 6 home runs, 16 RBI, and 36 walks. 

Overall in 2022, combined with both teams, Soto played 152 total games with a .244 batting average, 27 home runs, 62 RBI, and an MLB-leading 135 walks. He walked in 20.3% of his plate appearances, tops in the major leagues, and had the highest BB/K% in the majors, at 1.41. He swung at a lower percentage of pitches outside the strike zone (19.9%) than any other major league batter.

On January 13, 2023, Soto signed a one-year, $23 million contract with the Padres, avoiding salary arbitration.

Playing style

Soto is known for his exceptional plate discipline, ranking 5th all time in walk rate and 10th all time in career on-base percentage among hitters with least 2000 plate appearances at the conclusion of the 2021 season. During his 2018 rookie season, Soto became known for his movements in the batter's box after he successfully takes a pitch for a ball. Dubbed the "Soto Shuffle," the routine often includes Soto swinging his hips, wiping the dirt with a wide arc of his leg, tapping his leg, hopping, or lowering himself into a squat and staring at the pitcher. As an ESPN writer described it: "He'll swing his hips or spread his legs or sweep his feet or shimmy his shoulders or lick his lips or squeeze his, um, junk, sometimes all at once". Soto says he started the routine in the minor leagues "to get in the minds of the pitchers, because sometimes they get scared". In Game 1 of the 2019 National League Championship Series, St. Louis Cardinals pitcher Miles Mikolas responded to Soto's antics by grabbing his own crotch after retiring Soto on a ground out. Soto responded later by saying, "He got me out, he can do whatever he wants." In subsequent seasons, Soto eliminated crotch-grabbing from the routine.

Soto employs a "two-strike approach" in which he raises his grip along the bat handle and adopts a wider, lower stance, sometimes described as a crouch, in the batter's box. He is noted for his ability to drive the ball to all fields, even on a two-strike count. At the conclusion of his 2020 season, Soto had hit 69 career home runs in MLB and divided them evenly by direction: 23 to left field, 23 to center field, and 23 to right field.

Although he was a finalist for a Gold Glove Award as a left fielder after the 2019 season, Soto has indicated a preference for playing right field, his main position during his brief minor league career. The Nationals began deploying him as their starting right fielder late in the 2020 season and he became the Nationals everyday right fielder in 2021. Soto is statistically a significantly better defender in right field than in left field: in left field he has produced −3.8 UZR per 150 games while in right field he has produced +1.5 UZR per 150 games.

See also

 List of Major League Baseball players from the Dominican Republic
 List of Washington Nationals team records

References

External links

1998 births
Living people
Auburn Doubledays players
Dominican Republic expatriate baseball players in the United States
Gulf Coast Nationals players
Hagerstown Suns players
Harrisburg Senators players
Major League Baseball outfielders
Major League Baseball players from the Dominican Republic
National League All-Stars
National League batting champions
Potomac Nationals players
San Diego Padres players
Silver Slugger Award winners
Sportspeople from Santo Domingo
Washington Nationals players
2023 World Baseball Classic players